Crna Bara (Serbian Cyrillic: Црна Бара, Hungarian: Feketetó) is a village in Serbia. It is situated in the Čoka municipality, North Banat District, Vojvodina province. The village is ethnically mixed and its population numbering 568 people (2002 census).

Ethnic groups (2002 census)

Population of the village include:
 267 (47.01%) Hungarians
 235 (41.37%) Serbs
 21 (3.70%) Romani
 12 (2.11%) Yugoslavs
 others.

Historical population

1961: 950
1971: 823
1981: 678
1991: 595
2002: 568

Politics
The president of the Local Community is Gabriela Nerandžić (Hungarian: Nerandzic Gabriella "Ela").

References
Slobodan Ćurčić, Broj stanovnika Vojvodine, Novi Sad, 1996.

See also

List of places in Serbia
List of cities, towns and villages in Vojvodina

Populated places in Serbian Banat
Čoka